Jeannette "Jeannie" Ortega (born November 19, 1986) is an American singer, songwriter, dancer, actress, writer, and journalist. She made her recording debut in 2006 with the album No Place Like BKLYN at the age of 19. The album featured the hit single "Crowded", which reached the Billboard Hot 100.

Biography
Jeannie Ortega was born in Bushwick, Brooklyn, New York and is of Puerto Rican descent. While attending Brooklyn High School of the Arts, Ortega's song "Got What It Takes" was placed on the soundtrack for the 2003 comedy Love Don't Cost a Thing, and the song "Future Is Clear" appeared on the TV show soundtrack for That's So Raven!. She was quickly signed with Hollywood Records in 2002 and released her debut single "It's R Time" in October 2005. The song later appeared on the Freedom Writers soundtrack in 2007.

Ortega spent several years on the tween pop Radio Disney circuit of radio interviews, live mall shows, and other promotional activities as she worked on her debut album in 2005. In 2006, Ortega followed "It's R Time" with the urban-pop single "Crowded" the single quickly became a mainstream pop hit, eventually peaking in the top twenty-five of the Billboard chart. On September 12, 2006, Ortega's debut album No Place Like BKLYN was released, two weeks later the album entered the Billboard Top Heatseekers chart at number-one. On July 17, Ortega appeared on an episode of One Life to Live.

In July 2006, Ortega joined Rihanna as the opening act for her world tour. I admire her so much, Rihanna said of Ortega. She's a sweetheart and she is so grateful to be on tour with me and that's what I love. She's gonna kill it. Ortega followed that tour with the "Lo Maximo de la Musica National Tour" alongside Frankie J, Luis Fonsi, Nina Sky and Orishas. Following the tour, she was dropped from Hollywood Records.

She appeared at the Music Unites benefit on March 17, 2010, speaking about her forthcoming album.

Ortega has since become a Christian artist and signed with AIC Records. On April 26, 2011, Jeannie released her debut EP New Day. Jeannie Ortega released her sophomore album Perfect Love on January 30, 2012. Ortega released her third album Love Changed Me on November 1, 2016. Jeannie Ortega and her older sister Yoselyn were raised Santeria. She contemplated suicide as a child. Jeannie eventually became a Christian. She married Renn Law on December 27, 2009. Jeannie and Renn now live in Orlando, Florida. They run their own church Most High King Ministries. Jeannie Ortega suffered three miscarriages. On September 27, 2021 Jeannie and Renn welcomed their son Elionaijah Law.

Writing
On February 2, 2021, after the COVID-19 pandemic began, Ortega released her debut book What Is Happening to Me?: Discern and Defeat Your Unseen Enemy. She signed with Baker Publishing Group. Ortega writes as a journalist for The Christian Post.

Filmography
2006 - Step Up  Girl Singer #3

Discography

Albums
2006 - No Place Like BKLYN (August 1, 2006)
2012 - Perfect Love (January 31, 2012)
2016 - Love Changed Me (November 1, 2016)

Singles
2005 - "It's R Time" (featuring Gemstar, N.O.R.E., Big Mato) (No Place Like BKLYN)
2006 - "Crowded" (featuring Papoose) (No Place Like BKLYN)
2006 - "So Done" (No Place Like BKLYN)
2008 - "A Girl Like That" Lucas Prata featuring Jeannie Ortega
2010 - "Beautiful Day"
2010 - "Strong"
2013 - "Imperfection" (Feat. Righteous Rebel) (Perfect Love)

EPs
"New Day" (April 26, 2011)
"Road To 31" (2018)

Writings
 What Is Happening to Me?: Discern and Defeat Your Unseen Enemy (2021)

See also
Puerto Rican Americans

References

External links

Jeannie Ortega
Most High King Ministries

1986 births
Living people
American child singers
American performers of Christian music
American women singer-songwriters
American women pop singers
American contemporary R&B singers
Hollywood Records artists
Musicians from Brooklyn
People from Queens, New York
American musicians of Puerto Rican descent
American hip hop singers
Singers from New York City
21st-century American women singers
People from Bushwick, Brooklyn
American Christians
American writers
American journalists
21st-century American singers
Singer-songwriters from New York (state)